Nina Gennadyevna Vislova (born 4 October 1986) is a badminton player from Russia. Along with her doubles partner Valeria Sorokina, Vislova is the first Russian Olympic medalist in badminton.

Career 
Vislova won four medals at the European Junior Badminton Championships: two gold medals in women's doubles (2003 and 2005), a silver medal in mixed doubles (2003), and a bronze medal also in mixed doubles (2005). Nina also won at the 2006 U.S. Open Badminton Championships in the women's and mixed doubles event. She won the gold medal at the 2010 European Badminton Championships and bronze medals in 2008 and 2012 in women's doubles with Valeria Sorokina. In Russia, her home country, she has won eight national titles as of 2014.

She played in women's doubles discipline at the 2012 Summer Olympics with Valeria Sorokina and finished in third place after winning bronze medal match against Canadian women's doubles players, Alex Bruce and Michelle Li with 21-9, 21-10.

Achievements

Olympic Games 
Women's doubles

European Championships 
Women's doubles

Summer Universiade 
Mixed doubles

European Junior Championships 
Girls' doubles

Mixed doubles

BWF Grand Prix 
The BWF Grand Prix has two levels, the Grand Prix and Grand Prix Gold. It is a series of badminton tournaments sanctioned by the Badminton World Federation (BWF) since 2007. The World Badminton Grand Prix sanctioned by International Badminton Federation since 1983.

Women's singles

Women's doubles

Mixed doubles

  BWF Grand Prix Gold tournament
  BWF Grand Prix tournament

BWF International Challenge/Series 
Women's doubles

Mixed doubles

  BWF International Challenge tournament
  BWF International Series tournament
  BWF Future Series tournament

References

External links 
 
 

Living people
1986 births
Badminton players from Moscow
Russian female badminton players
Badminton players at the 2012 Summer Olympics
Olympic badminton players of Russia
Olympic bronze medalists for Russia
Olympic medalists in badminton
Medalists at the 2012 Summer Olympics
Badminton players at the 2015 European Games
European Games competitors for Russia
Universiade medalists in badminton
Universiade bronze medalists for Russia
Medalists at the 2013 Summer Universiade
21st-century Russian women